Ali Reza Mahjoub (born 14 May 1958) is an Iranian reformist politician, trade unionist and workers' rights activist who was a member of the Iranian Parliament and head of its "Worker fraction". He is Secretary-General of Worker House, as well as member of Islamic Labour Party's central committee. He was founder of Islamic Republican Party's worker wing in 1980s. Mahjoub holds a B.A. in History from University of Tehran.

Electoral history

References

1958 births
Living people
Members of the 5th Islamic Consultative Assembly
Members of the 6th Islamic Consultative Assembly
Members of the 7th Islamic Consultative Assembly
Members of the 8th Islamic Consultative Assembly
Members of the 9th Islamic Consultative Assembly
Members of the 10th Islamic Consultative Assembly
People from Alborz Province
Islamic Labour Party politicians
Islamic Republican Party politicians
University of Tehran alumni
Followers of Wilayat fraction members
Worker House members
Secretaries-General of political parties in Iran